The 1955 U.S. Open was the 55th U.S. Open, held June 16–19 at the Lake Course of the Olympic Club in San Francisco, California. In one of the greatest upsets in golf history, Jack Fleck, a municipal course pro from Iowa, prevailed in an 18-hole playoff to win his only major title and denied Ben Hogan a record fifth U.S. Open.

Fleck, 32, won two more titles on the PGA Tour and later won the Senior PGA Championship in 1979. He won the U.S. Open with clubs manufactured by Hogan's company.

Hogan, 42, never did win his fifth U.S. Open or a tenth major; he won just one more tour event the rest of his career, in 1959. It was his fourth and final playoff in a major championship, all at 18 holes. Hogan won at the U.S. Open in 1950 but lost twice by a stroke at the Masters, to Byron Nelson in 1942 and Sam Snead in 1954. He repeated as runner-up at the U.S. Open in 1956, and had top ten finishes in 1958, 1959, and 1960. (A pre-tournament favorite in 1957, he withdrew due to a back ailment before teeing off.) When the U.S. Open returned to Olympic in 1966, Hogan finished twelfth at age 53 and received a standing ovation at the 72nd green.

Byron Nelson came out of semi-retirement to play in his final U.S. Open and finished in 28th place. Arnold Palmer made the cut for the first time at the U.S. Open and finished in 21st. For the first time since 1919, Gene Sarazen did not play in the U.S. Open, ending a streak of 31 consecutive appearances.

This was the first U.S. Open at the Lake Course of the Olympic Club; it returned in 1966, 1987, 1998, and 2012.

Course layout

Lake Course

Past champions in the field

Made the cut

Missed the cut

Round summaries

First round
Thursday, June 16, 1955

Source:

Second round
Friday, June 17, 1955

Source:

Third round
Saturday, June 18, 1955 (morning)

Final round
Saturday, June 18, 1955 (afternoon)

After Hogan made par on the 72nd hole to post a 287 total, most observers believed that he had already locked up the championship. Gene Sarazen, providing television commentary, congratulated him on the win and the NBC broadcast went off the air after proclaiming Hogan the champion. Fleck, however, was only a stroke behind playing the 14th. A bogey there, however, dropped him to two back. Fleck then made birdie on 15 and pars at 16 and 17, after a  birdie attempt lipped out.

(a) denotes amateur

Playoff
Sunday, June 19, 1955

Despite overwhelming odds against him, Fleck held a two-stroke lead over Hogan at the turn. After a third consecutive birdie at 10, Fleck's lead was three. But after a bogey at 17, the lead had dropped to just a single stroke on the 18th tee. Hogan hooked his drive into the very deep rough and took three strokes to get on the fairway: he made a  putt to save double-bogey, but Fleck's regulation par sealed the upset by three strokes, 69 to 72.

Scorecard

{|class="wikitable" span = 50 style="font-size:85%;
|-
|style="background: Pink;" width=10|
|Birdie
|style="background: PaleGreen;" width=10|
|Bogey
|style="background: Green;" width=10|
|Double bogey
|}
Source:

References

Further reading

External links
USGA Championship Database
USOpen.com - 1955
The Olympic Club

U.S. Open (golf)
Golf in California
Sports competitions in San Francisco
U.S. Open
U.S. Open
U.S. Open
U.S. Open